Turbonilla kraussii is a species of sea snail, a marine gastropod mollusk in the family Pyramidellidae, the pyrams and their allies.

References

External links
 Adams, H. & Adams, A. (1853-1858). The genera of Recent Mollusca; arranged according to their organization. London, van Voorst. Vol. 1: xl + 484 pp.; vol. 2: 661 pp.; vol. 3: 138 pls
 Clessin, S. (1899-1902). Die Familie der Eulimidae. Systematisches Conchylien-Cabinet. 1(28): 1-273, Taf. 1-41
 Krauss, F. (1848) Die Südafrikanischen Mollusken. Ein Beitrag zur Kenntniss der Mollusken des Kap- und Natallandes und zur Geographischen Verbreitung derselben mit Beschreibung und Abbildung der neuen Arten. Ebner and Seubert, Stuttgart, 140 pp., 6 pls
 To World Register of Marine Species

kraussii
Gastropods described in 1890